Frowyk is a surname. Notable people with the surname include:

John Frowyk (died 1359), English-born Irish cleric and judge
Sir Thomas Frowyk ( 1460–1506), English justice